Gardeners Park is located in Nagatino-Sadovniki District (raion), Southern Administrative Okrug of Moscow. It was found in 1989.

Governing body is State autonomous institution of culture Park of Culture and Recreation "Kuzminki".

September 21, 2021 was renamed in honor of Moscow Mayor Yuri Luzhkov.

Gallery

References

External links
 Website of the park

Parks and gardens in Moscow